Aberdeen Crossrail is a proposed railway development in Scotland, first proposed within the 2003 Scottish Strategic Rail Study. It is supported by Nestrans, the north-east of Scotland's voluntary regional transport partnership.

Crossrail aims to provide a frequent, cross-city rail service between Inverurie, Aberdeen and Stonehaven, coupled with new stations.

It proposed upgrading existing train services from Aberdeen to Inverurie to a regular half-hourly service, adding more services between Aberdeen and Stonehaven, and opening new stations along existing lines in Aberdeen and Aberdeenshire. It could also bring about the re-opening of lines and stations between Aberdeen and the towns of Fraserburgh, Peterhead and Banchory.

The project is seen as vital in reducing traffic congestion within Aberdeen. Currently, only 12% of north-east residents live within 1 km of a railway station, but if all of the Crossrail proposals were to go ahead, this could rise to 25%. This would aid commuting into the city centre and provide a viable alternative to using the car.

Proposal 
The project aimed to have a train between Inverurie, Aberdeen, and Stonehaven every 15 minutes. It also included the reopening of stations at Kintore, Altens, and Newtonhill.

Feasibility studies
The Scottish Executive began a £400,000 feasibility study into the project in June 2005, the outcome of which was expected to be announced by March 2007. A document published in 2010 reported that the predicted costs would be greater than the additional ticket revenues generated for the Crossrail project, regardless of whether services ran at a 15 minute or a 30 minute frequency.

This feasibility study into the project indicated that Crossrail could best be delivered on an incremental basis. Nestrans' Draft Rail Action Plan 2010-2021 considered how to achieve frequency and service improvements in the short term, leading to the opening of new stations - such as at Kintore - and more significant service enhancements over time.

Network Rail has completed a GRIP2 study to investigate options for Aberdeen - Inverness line improvements, including consideration of a new station at Kintore.  The report was published on the Transport Scotland website on 22 March 2011. This confirmed that an hourly service frequency and two hour journey time would be feasible. The Stage 3 study examining the range of options in greater detail is underway and is expected to be completed during 2012.

Implementation

Laurencekirk railway station opened in May 2009.

Transport Scotland announced in March 2016 that the scheme will go ahead as part of a wider timetable recast in 2018. The Aberdeen to Inverurie section will then have a 30-minute interval service in operation. Infrastructure enhancements on the Aberdeen to Inverness line (including the redoubling of track from Aberdeen to Inverurie) are also scheduled to be completed by this time, as part of a £170 million route upgrade project.

In 2019, improvements were made to the line between Aberdeen and Inverurie to allow for a higher service frequency. This was completed under the Aberdeen to Inverness Improvement Project.

Kintore railway station opened in October 2020.

See also
Edinburgh Crossrail
Crossrail Glasgow

References 

Transport in Aberdeen
Proposed railway lines in Scotland
Stonehaven
Transport in Aberdeenshire
Inverurie
Portlethen
Kintore, Aberdeenshire
Montrose, Angus
Laurencekirk